The Chiloé wigeon (Mareca sibilatrix), also known as the southern wigeon, is one of three extant species of wigeon in the genus Mareca of the dabbling duck subfamily. This bird is indigenous to the southern part of South America, including the Chiloé Archipelago.
Its specific epithet, sibilatrix, means 'whistler', referring to the bird's.It's name comes from its residence,the Chloe Archipelago

Description

This bird has an iridescent green-blue cap on its head, and a bluish gray bill with a black tip. The cheeks and forehead are white, the eyes are dark brown, and there is a white auricular patch. The neck and occipital part of the head are black. The breast is barred black and white and the plumage of the wings is gray and white. The flanks of males are rust colored, and light brown on females. The legs and feet are gray.

Sexual dimorphism is relatively subtle in this species of wigeon. Males are usually somewhat larger and heavier, and with somewhat brighter plumage and more strongly pronounced iridescence of the cap. Apart from these features, it can be difficult to distinguish the two sexes. Juveniles resemble adult birds, but the rust coloring on the flanks is diminished or absent.

Distribution and habitat

This duck is indigenous to the southern part of South America, where it is found on freshwater lakes, marshes, shallow lagoons and slow flowing rivers. Vagrants have been observed in South Georgia, South Orkney and the South Shetland Islands.

It breeds primarily in Argentina, Uruguay, and Chile. The northern border of the breeding range is in Argentina at 36° S and Chile at 40° S. It also breeds sparingly in the Falkland Islands. It migrates to southeastern Brazil for the winter.

It was first introduced to Europe in 1870; it soon bred in zoos.

Because the Chiloé wigeon is widely distributed and has a large, stable wild population, it is categorized as least concern by the IUCN.

Ecology and behavior

The Chiloé wigeon displays a variety of behaviors depending on habitat. It is an omnivore, feeding predominantly on aquatic plants and grass, and occasionally coastal algae.

This monogamous species breeds in the austral spring, between September and December. Pairs inhabit very small breeding territories, building their nests in grasses and under bushes. The female lays eight to ten white or cream-colored eggs. After a gestation period of approximately 24–25 days the ducklings are born. The father helps raise the ducklings; however, he leaves the family after the offspring molt.

Captive hybrids with the Philippine Duck (Anas luzonica) have been described.

References

Works cited
 Kolbe, Hartmut; The Ducks of the World, Ulmer Verlag 1999, 
 Woods, A, Woods, R: Atlas of Breeding Birds of the Falkland Islands, Anthony Nelson, Shorpshire 1997,

External links
 Anas sibilatrix videos, photos & sounds on the Internet Bird Collection
 Sea World

Chiloé wigeon
Birds of Chile
Chiloé Archipelago
Chiloé wigeon
Taxa named by Eduard Friedrich Poeppig
Wigeons